George Johnson, OC (November 18, 1920 – July 8, 1995) was a medical doctor and is seen by historians as one of the leading political reformers of the twentieth century in Manitoba. He served as a Cabinet Minister in the governments of Dufferin Roblin and Walter Weir and as the province's 20th Lieutenant Governor from 1986 to 1993.

Early life
Johnson was born in Winnipeg, to a family of Icelandic heritage. He received a B.Sc. and M.D. from the University of Manitoba and served as a Lieutenant (later, Captain) with the Royal Canadian Navy from 1941 to 1945.

Political career
Johnson was first elected to the Manitoba legislature in 1958, for the riding of Gimli, north of Winnipeg. A Progressive Conservative, he was appointed Minister of Health and Public Welfare in the minority government of Dufferin Roblin, who had personally recruited him to run for the party. He retained the health portfolio when the Progressive Conservatives won a majority government in 1959, and oversaw a policy of major hospital expansions in the province and other significant reforms between 1959 and 1963.

On December 9, 1963, Johnson moved to the Ministry of Education as the government sought to cope with the educational requirements of a rapidly expanding baby-boom population. He held this position until September 24, 1968, and was responsible for, among other achievements, the establishment of the universities of Winnipeg and Brandon, respectively, and the Manitoba Institute of Technology (later 'Red River Community College'), and for introducing the policy of "shared services" for public and separate schools (allowing children in separate schools to access public programs for busing, textbooks and the like). In 1968, Johnson returned to his old portfolio as Minister of Health, to oversee an historic change in the provision of medical services: the implementation of medicare in Manitoba.

Ideologically, Johnson was a progressive, often referred to as (somewhat erroneously) a Red Tory with beliefs similar to those held by Premier Roblin. Along with Roblin, he is considered by historians to be the leading political reformer of his generation and among the most influential cabinet ministers in Manitoba history. Although generally a free marketeer, Johnson supported government intervention in the economy in certain areas, for example, in such areas as public utility management, education, major infrastructure projects and certain medical services. When Roblin shifted to federal politics in 1967, Johnson was the only candidate from the Progressive Conservative Party's progressive wing to seek its leadership. A late entry into the leadership race hurt his campaign and while he was the alternative choice for leader among many delegates, the fact that Johnson did not survive to the later balloting prevented him from emerging as the possible compromise choice for party leader among delegates.

Break from politics
Johnson did not seek re-election in 1969, and returned to medical practice in Winnipeg. An experienced physician, within a few years he had one of the largest medical practices in Manitoba.

Lieutenant governorship
Leaving medicine again for the public arena in 1978, Johnson served for the subsequent eight years as a special consultant to the Manitoba government, providing strategic advice and counsel to the government in various areas of health policy. On December 11, 1986, in "recognition of his services to the people of Manitoba", he was appointed as the province's lieutenant governor by Governor General Jeanne Sauvé, on the advice of Prime Minister Brian Mulroney. He served in this position until March 5, 1993.

Honours
In his career, the governments of Canada and Iceland conferred on Johnson the highest civilian honours that can be bestowed on their respective citizens: the Order of Canada in 1994, and the Icelandic Order of the Falcon in 1992. He was also awarded honorary Doctor of Laws degrees from three universities: Manitoba, Winnipeg and Royal Roads (1992–95).

George Johnson Middle School in Gimli was named in his honour.

Death
Johnson died in 1995 in Gimli. His wife, the former Doris Blondal, died the following year. They had six children and ten grandchildren. Their daughter Janis was a Manitoba senator for twenty six years.

Arms

References

External links 
 

1920 births
1995 deaths
Canadian military personnel of World War II
Canadian people of Icelandic descent
Lieutenant Governors of Manitoba
Members of the Executive Council of Manitoba
Officers of the Order of Canada
People from Gimli, Manitoba
Politicians from Winnipeg
Progressive Conservative Party of Manitoba MLAs
University of Manitoba alumni